Für dich. ("For You.") is the seventh studio album by German singer Xavier Naidoo, released by Naidoo Records on 24 November 2017 in German-speaking Europe. Upon its release, it debuted at number three on the German Albums Chart. It had been Naidoos's first album for 20 years that failed to top the charts.

Track listing

Charts

Weekly charts

Year-end charts

Release history

References

External links
 

2017 albums
Xavier Naidoo albums